HD 60150 (HR 2888) is a solitary star located in the southern circumpolar constellation Volans. It has an apparent magnitude of 6.39, placing it near the limit for naked eye visibility.

HD 60150 has a classification of K5 III, indicating that it is a red giant. It has 1.2 times the mass of the Sun but has expanded to 41 times its girth. It radiates 329 times the luminosity of the Sun from its swollen photosphere at an effective temperature of 4,007 K, giving it a reddish orange hue. HD 60150 is metal enriched, with an iron abundance 38% greater than the Sun.

References 

Volantis, 12
060150
2888
Durchmusterung objects
K-type giants
Volans (constellation)
036346